Zugsmith is a surname. Notable people with the surname include:

Albert Zugsmith (1910–1993), American film producer, film director, and screenwriter
Leane Zugsmith (1903–1969), American writer